The Anne Vondeling prize (Anne Vondelingprijs), named after the politician Anne Vondeling a member of the Dutch Labour Party, is an annual award in The Netherlands given to journalists who write in a clear manner concerning political subjects.

Recipients

References

External links 
 

Journalism awards
Awards established in 1980
Dutch awards